Mohammad Nadeemuddin (born 13 November 1982) is an Indian former cricketer. He played six List A matches for Hyderabad between 2002 and 2005.

See also
 List of Hyderabad cricketers

References

External links
 

1982 births
Living people
Indian cricketers
Hyderabad cricketers
Cricketers from Hyderabad, India